Lophocampa hyalinipuncta is a moth in the family Erebidae. It was described by Walter Rothschild in 1909. It is found in Ecuador (Morona-Santiago, Carchi), Peru (Huanuco, Puno, Amazonas) and Bolivia (La Paz, Cochabamba, Chuquisaca).

Description
Male

Frons white mixed with black hairs and with a chevron-shaped black mark; vertex greyish black; thorax black, splashed and mixed with creamy white, inner side of patagia orange buff; abdomen orange buff above, densely clothed with sooty hairs, last segment sooty grey. Forewing sooty black, densely irrorated (sprinkled) with creamy white, a number of basal patches, costal patches, and a transverse row of submarginal patches creamy white; disc of wing occupied by four irregular transverse bands of large hyaline (glass-like) patches. Hindwing hyaline white, yellowish at base.

Length of forewing 23–27 mm.

References

"Lophocampa hyalinipuncta". Encyclopedia of Life. Archived from the original December 23, 2016.

Moths described in 1909
hyalinipuncta